Ryan  Felix (born June 21, 1993) is an American soccer player who plays as a defender.

Club career 
Felix began his professional career at FC Tucson at age 19. 

He played two seasons at the Orange County Blues, as a center back and a holding midfielder. Felix was expected to shine at his new club, but only got half the game time expected and things didn’t go as planned.

In 2017, Felix played 33 matches with the Rochester Rhinos, scoring one goal. He left the club the following season and went to San Antonio, where he played 16 matches in 2018. 

For the 2019 season, Felix signed for the Rowdies. He made a total of one appearance, which was as a substitute.

References

External links
 USL Pro profile

1993 births
Living people
Soccer players from Los Angeles
Loyola Marymount Lions men's soccer players
FC Tucson players
Orange County SC players
Rochester New York FC players
San Antonio FC players
Tampa Bay Rowdies players
USL League Two players
USL Championship players
Association football defenders
American soccer players